Sádaba Castle is a castle in Sádaba, Aragon, eastern Spain, located some  north of Zaragoza.

The castle is mentioned for the first time in a document from 1125, although the architectural structure suggests it was built in the first half of the 13th century. It is a typical Middle Ages castle with Cistercian-style decorations, tall walls and seven square towers.  Inside is a courtyard with a large rainwater tank in the middle and a chapel in the corner. It is not known who built it, but it is suspected that Sancho VII of Navarre ordered it to be built. At the sides of the castle are the remains of two large halls, which probably were two stories high. It measures .

See also
List of Bienes de Interés Cultural in the Province of Zaragoza

References
Castles.nl: Sádaba Castle

Castles in Aragon
Buildings and structures in the Province of Zaragoza
Buildings and structures completed in the 13th century
Bien de Interés Cultural landmarks in the Province of Zaragoza
Romanesque architecture in Aragon